Barney Fisher (born December 17, 1947) is an American politician who served in the Missouri House of Representatives from the 125th district from 2005 to 2013.

References

1947 births
Living people
People from Nevada, Missouri
Republican Party members of the Missouri House of Representatives